Disa bracteata, also known as South African weed orchid is a species of orchid native to South Africa.

It is one of the few orchid species which has become naturalized in Australia. It was first recorded in Western Australia in 1944, in South Australia in 1988 and Victoria in 1994. There is also a single recording in Tasmania.Disa bracteata is classified as invasive in Australia. In sites where D. bracteata has invaded, there have been up to 80 individuals found per square meter of the area. The similarity of environmental conditions in Australia and South Africa have allowed D. bracteata'', as well as many other species native to South Africa, to become naturalized in regions of Australia.

References

External links 

bracteata
Orchids of South Africa